The Jar is a 1984 American horror film directed by Bruce Toscano.

Plot
A schoolteacher named Paul gets in an auto accident with an old man. After bringing the old man to his apartment to heal him, Paul finds that the man has disappeared, leaving behind a bottle in a paper bag. Within the bottle is a demon who possesses Paul and induces hallucinations including vignettes of being crucified and fighting as a soldier. Paul murders his neighbor and passes on his demonic possession to his boss.

Cast 

 Gary Wallace as Paul 
 Karin Sjöberg as Crystal 
 Dean Schoepter as Young Man
 Les Miller as Old Man
 Robert Gerald Witt as Jack
 Don Donovan as Jester

Legacy
In 2015, the film was featured on an episode of Red Letter Media's Best of the Worst, together with Future War and White Fire. The film was rated by the hosts as one of the worst ever featured on the show, and the end of the episode has the hosts melting their copy of The Jar in a jar filled with acetone.

References

External links

1984 films
1984 horror films
American supernatural horror films
1980s English-language films
1980s American films